The 2017–18 EuroLeague Women was the 60th edition of the European women's club basketball championship organized by FIBA, and the 22nd edition since being rebranded as the EuroLeague Women.

Team allocation
A total of 18 teams from 10 countries will participate in the 2017–18 EuroLeague Women.

Teams
League positions of the previous season shown in parentheses (TH: EuroLeague Women title holders; EC: EuroCup Women title holders):

Round and draw dates
The schedule of the competition is as follows:

Draw
The draw was held on 4 July 2017 at the FIBA headquarters in Munich, Germany. The 16 teams were drawn into two groups of eight. For the draw, the teams were seeded into eight seeds, based on their performance in European competitions in the last three seasons.

Qualifying round

|}

Regular season

Regular season started on 11 October 2017 and finished on 31 January 2018.

The four top teams of each group will qualify to the quarterfinals.

If teams are level on record at the end of the Regular Season, tiebreakers are applied in the following order:
 Head-to-head record.
 Head-to-head point differential.
 Point differential during the Regular Season.
 Points scored during the regular season.
 Sum of quotients of points scored and points allowed in each Regular Season game.

Group A

Group B

Quarter-finals

|}

First leg

Second leg

Third leg

Final four

Semifinals

Third place game

Final

Individual statistics

Points

Rebounds

Assists

Other statistics

References

External links
 

2017–18 in European women's basketball leagues
EuroLeague Women seasons